Dwight Morrell Smith (born 1931) served the University of Denver (DU) from 1972–1989 and 1992 to the present as a chemistry professor, academic administrator, and chancellor of the university. In 1984 he was named the 15th chancellor of the University.

Background

Dwight M. Smith was born on October 10, 1931 in Hudson, New York. He graduated from Central College in Pella, Iowa in 1953 with a degree in chemistry; He earned his Ph.D. from Pennsylvania State University in 1957. He was honored with a Sc.D. and Litt.D. from Central College in 1986 and the University of Denver in 1990.  He married Alice Bond in 1955. Smith worked as a postdoctoral fellow and instructor at the California Institute of Technology from 1957–1959, senior chemist for Texaco Research Center in Beacon, New York from 1959–1961, assistant professor of chemistry at Wesleyan University in Middletown, Connecticut from 1961–1966, associate professor of Hope College in Holland, Michigan from 1966–1969, and professor at the same college from 1969-1972. Smith also worked as a National Science Foundation Faculty Fellow at the Scripps Institution of Oceanography from 1971-1972 before joining DU as a chemistry professor and chair in 1972.

Career

From 1983-1984 Smith was the Vice Chancellor for Academic Affairs and in 1984 he became the 15th chancellor of the University. DU was in the midst of a budget crisis at the time and Smith reorganized the structure and changed the direction of the University’s programs, departments, and schools during his term of office. He replaced the College of Arts and Sciences with an undergraduate college and four faculties and started the core curriculum in tandem with a movement to create a coherent general education curriculum in universities nationwide. He played a major role in gaining funding for the Seeley G. Mudd Building (built in 1982), one of three principal buildings that houses the Departments of Chemistry and Biological Sciences. The University also acquired and established the first College of Systems Science.

Scholarship

As a scholar his works included editing Revisions on Petroleum Chemistry, 1975–78, and editorial advisory board member, Recent Research Developments in Applied Spectroscopy beginning in 1998. He was a member of the American Association for the Advancement of Science, the American Association of Aerosol Research, the American Chemical Society and the Society for Applied Spectroscopy. Smith was also a member of the advisory board for the Solar Energy Research Institute (1989–1991), a member of the visiting committee of the Zettlemoyer Center for Surface Studies at Lehigh University (1990–1996), a member of the Science Advisory Board at Denver Research Institute at DU (1996–2006), and a senior adviser for the Rocky Mountain Center for Homeland Defense (2001–2007).
Smith left the University of Denver in 1990 to become the president of Hawaii Loa College, a position he held until 1992 when he returned to the University of Denver.

References

Chancellors of the University of Denver
1931 births
Living people